Lucy-Anne Holmes is a British author, actor and campaigner. She is best known for founding the No More Page 3 campaign in 2012 to convince editors to cease publishing images of topless female glamour models on the third page of tabloid newspapers, for which the BBC recognised her as one of its 100 women in 2014.
She lives in Suffolk with her partner and young son. She grew up a Catholic and is now a Quaker.

Holmes has authored several books: 50 Ways to Find a Lover (Pan, 2009); The (Im)Perfect Girlfriend (Pan, 2010); Unlike A Virgin (Sphere, 2011); Just a Girl Standing in Front of a Boy (Sphere, 2014), winner of the Romantic Novelists Association 'Rom Com of the Year 2015'; How To Start A Revolution (Transworld Digital, 2015) –  described a how-to for making change happen, and the history of the No More Page 3 campaign; and Don't Hold My Head Down (Unbound, 2019) – a memoir about sex. In 2021, her Women on Top of the World: What Women Think About When They're Having Sex, written after interviewing 51 women around the world, was published.

Actor
Threatre

Television and Film

Notes

References

External links 

Articles by Lucy-Ann Holmes
I wanted to explore my own pleasure' – how I rebooted my sex life Article in The Guardian, 18 May 2019.
If you want to write about feminism online, be ready to take on the haters Article in The Guardian, 1 April 2015.

Other Links
Lucy-Ann Holmes at Jo Unwin Literary Agency
No More Page 3's Lucy-Anne Holmes Talks Activist Burnout, Being Skint And (Probably) Winning Her Fight Against The Sun Huffington Post article by Louise Ridley, 8 March 2015
“I just felt a lot of passion” No More Page Three founder, Lucy-Anne Holmes on how she spread her idea BBC, 28 May 2015.
Interview by Rebecca Hardy The Friend, 4 April 2019

Living people
Year of birth missing (living people)
21st-century British writers
BBC 100 Women